Aglaomorpha novoguineensis is a species of ferns in the family Polypodiaceae. It is native to New Guinea.

References

 Specimens in the Herbarium Berolinense digital collection

External links

Aglaomorpha
Ferns of Asia
Flora of New Guinea